The 1891 Paisley by-election was a parliamentary by-election held on 1 June 1891 for the British House of Commons constituency of Paisley in Scotland. It was caused by the death of the constituency's sitting Liberal Member of Parliament William Boyle Barbour who had held the seat since the 1885 general election.

Result
The seat was held for the Liberals by William Dunn, a Paisley born, self-made, merchant banker.

References

1891 elections in the United Kingdom
1891 in Scotland
1890s elections in Scotland
By-elections to the Parliament of the United Kingdom in Scottish constituencies
Politics of Paisley, Renfrewshire
History of Renfrewshire